Luis Hierro Gambardella (1 September 1915, Treinta y Tres - 17 July 1991) was a Uruguayan political figure.

Background 

He was a member of the Colorado Party.

His father Luis Hierro was a Deputy from Treinta y Tres. His son Luis Antonio Hierro López was Vice President of Uruguay from 2000 to 2005.

Public offices 

He served as a Deputy for Treinta y Tres from 1955 to 1967 and as a Senator from 1967 to 1973. He served as the President of the Chamber of Deputies of Uruguay from 1964 to 1965. In 1967, he was Minister of Culture.

Reelected to the Senate in 1984, he served as Ambassador to Spain from 1985 to 1990.

References

See also 
 Politics of Uruguay
 List of political families#Uruguay

1915 births
1991 deaths
People from Treinta y Tres
Uruguayan people of Spanish descent
Colorado Party (Uruguay) politicians
Education and Culture Ministers of Uruguay
Presidents of the Chamber of Representatives of Uruguay
Members of the Senate of Uruguay
Ambassadors of Uruguay to Spain